The New Zealand Poet Laureate is a poet appointed by the National Library of New Zealand to represent New Zealand's community of poets, to promote and advocate for poetry, and to produce a number of published works during their two-year tenure as laureate.

History of the award
The Poet Laureate for New Zealand was not originally appointed by a government agency, but by a commercial company. The award was established by Te Mata Estate, a winery in Hawke's Bay, in 1997, the year of the winery's centenary. Bill Manhire was named the first Te Mata Poet Laureate.

In 2007, the National Library of New Zealand took over the appointment of the Poet Laureate, and has appointed the last eight laureates: Michele Leggott, Cilla McQueen, Ian Wedde, Vincent O'Sullivan, C. K. Stead, Selina Tusitala Marsh,  David Eggleton, and Chris Tse, 2022-2024.

Nomination
The National Library accepts public nominations for the position, as well as nominations from universities, libraries and creative writing programmes. The National Librarian of New Zealand then makes the decision following advice from the Poet Laureate Advisory Council, which currently includes first Laureate Bill Manhire and Te Mata Estate chairman John Buck.

Award

The value of the award granted to the Poet Laureate is currently NZD$100,000, of which twenty per cent is retained by the National Library to cover costs such as events, promotion, and the Laureate's tokotoko. A tokotoko is a Māori carved ceremonial walking stick which is presented to the Laureate upon their appointment. The tokotoko is paired with the matua, or "parent tokotoko" which is retained and displayed by the National Library to signify their joint guardianship of the award with the Ngāti Kahungunu. The tokotoko are created by Hawke's Bay artist Jacob Scott, with the matua carved from black maire and containing a poem by the late Hone Tuwhare, the 1999–2001 Laureate.

Based on the tradition of the Poet Laureate of the United Kingdom receiving a "butt of sack", the New Zealand Poet Laureate also receives a stipend of wine from Te Mata Estate.

List of New Zealand Poets Laureate

References

External links
New Zealand Poet Laureate blog (National Library of New Zealand)

 
New Zealand poetry awards